Lacalma papuensis is a species of snout moth in the genus Lacalma. It was described by William Warren in 1891, and is known from New Guinea and Australia.

References

Moths described in 1891
Epipaschiinae
Pyralidae